Joshua Tarling (born 15 February 2004) is a Welsh track and road cyclist, who currently rides for UCI WorldTeam . He won the World junior time trial championship in 2022, having won the silver medal in 2021.

Cycling career
Tarling became a double British champion when winning the points and team pursuit events at the 2022 British National Track Championships.

For the 2023 season, Tarling will join UCI WorldTeam  on a three-year contract.

Major results

Road

2021
 2nd Overall Driedaagse van Axel
1st Stage 2a (ITT)
 2nd  Time trial, UCI World Junior Championships
 2nd Time trial, National Junior Championships
 3rd Grand Prix Bob Jungels
2022
 1st  Time trial, UCI World Junior Championships
 1st  Time trial, National Junior Championships
 1st  Overall Tour de Gironde
1st Stage 1a (ITT)
 1st Chrono des Nations Juniors
 1st Stage 3a (ITT) LVM Saarland Trofeo
 2nd Overall Junior Tour of Wales
1st Stages 1 (ITT) & 5
 6th Overall Trophée Centre Morbihan
1st  Mountains classification
1st Stage 2a (ITT)

Track

2021
 UEC European Junior Championships
1st  Omnium
1st  Team pursuit
 National Junior Championships
1st  Points
2nd Madison (with Josh Charlton)
3rd Individual pursuit
3rd Scratch
2022
 National Championships
1st  Team pursuit
1st  Points
 UEC European Junior Championships
3rd  Individual pursuit
3rd  Team pursuit
3rd  Madison (with Dylan Hicks)

References

External links

2004 births
Living people
British male cyclists
British track cyclists
Welsh track cyclists
Welsh male cyclists
Cyclists at the 2022 Commonwealth Games
Commonwealth Games competitors for Wales